'Never Trust Originality' is a 2003 bastard pop album by The Kleptones.

Track listing
 "Their Prayer" – 1:05
 "Maybe Another Here" – 8:32
 "Homesick" – 6:26
 "Potato Salad" – 5:21

See also
Bastard pop

External links
 Never Trust Originality - Official Kleptones Site

The Kleptones EPs
2003 remix albums
2003 debut EPs
Remix EPs